Isel Aneli Suñiga Morfín (born 7 September 1994) is a Guatemalan model and beauty pageant titleholder who won Miss Guatemala 2017. She represented Guatemala at the Miss Universe 2017.

Pageantary

Miss Guatemala 2017
Suñiga was crowned Miss Guatemala 2017 and then competed at Miss Universe 2017 in Las Vegas.

Miss Universe 2017
Suñiga represented Guatemala at Miss Universe 2017 but Unplaced.

References

External links
 Miss Guatemala of Facebook

1994 births
Living people
Miss Universe 2017 contestants
Miss Guatemala winners
Guatemalan beauty pageant winners